Sir Robert Workman Smith, 1st Baronet, JP (7 December 1880 – 6 December 1957) was a Scottish Unionist politician.

The youngest son of George Smith, shipowner, Glasgow, he was educated at Trinity College, Cambridge. He was a barrister at the Inner Temple.

Smith was unsuccessful candidate for Aberdeen and Kincardine Central in 1922–1923, and was elected as the Member of Parliament (MP) for the seat in 1924, holding it until 1945. He was a Justice of the Peace for the County of Aberdeen.

He was knighted in 1934 Birthday Honours and created a baronet in 1945.

References 

 

1880 births
1957 deaths
Alumni of Trinity College, Cambridge
Members of the Inner Temple
Unionist Party (Scotland) MPs
Baronets in the Baronetage of the United Kingdom
UK MPs 1924–1929
UK MPs 1929–1931
UK MPs 1931–1935
UK MPs 1935–1945
Knights Bachelor